McSpadden Hollow is a valley in Carter County in the U.S. state of Missouri.

McSpadden Hollow was named after Frank McSpadden, the proprietor of a local sawmill.

References

Valleys of Carter County, Missouri
Valleys of Missouri